Ruth Paul (born 1964) is a children's picture book author and illustrator from Wellington, New Zealand.

Paul completed a Bachelor of Arts at Victoria University of Wellington, and a Diploma of Visual Communication Design at Wellington Polytechnic (Massey University, Wellington). In 2004 Scholastic NZ published The Animal Undie Ball, her first publication as author and illustrator. Her books have since been translated into many languages. In 2019 she received the NZ Arts Foundation Malinson Rendel Laureate Award for Illustration.

Books
 2004 – The Animal Undie Ball 
 2005 – The Little White Lie 
 2007 – The King's Bubbles
 2008 – Superpotamus 
 2010 – Two Little Pirates 
 2011 – Stomp! 
 2012 – Hedgehog's Magic Tricks
 2013 – Red Panda's Toffee Apples
 2013 – Bad Dog Flash 
 2013 – My Dinosaur Dad 
 2014 – Rabbit's Hide and Seek
 2014 – Go Home Flash 
 2015 – Bye-Bye Grumpy Fly 
 2015 – What's The Time Dinosaur?
 2016 – My Meerkat Mum
 2017 – I Am Jellyfish
 2018 — Mini Whinny Happy Birthday to Me author Stacy Gregg 
 2018 — Little Hector and the Big Blue Whale
 2019 — Mini Whinny Goody Four Shoes author Stacy Gregg
 2019 — Little Hector and the Big Idea
 2019 — Mini Whinny Bad Day at the Ok Corral author Stacy Gregg
 2020 — Cookie Boo
 2020 — Little Hector Meets Mini Maui
 2021 — Mini Whinny No Place Like Home author Stacy Gregg
 2022 — Lion Guards the Cake

Awards
 2005 – Aim Children's Book Awards 2005, Honour Award for Tom's Story ill. Ruth Paul, written by Mandy Hager
 2008 – NZ Post Children's Book Awards, Children's Choice Award for The King's Bubbles
 2008 – BPANZ Children's Book Design Award, Winner for The King's Bubbles
 2011 – Storylines Notable Books listing for Two Little Pirates  
 2012 – Storylines Notable Books listing for Stomp!
 2012 – New Zealand Post Children's Book Awards, finalist for Stomp!
 2013 – Storylines Notable Books listing for Bad Dog Flash
 2018 – New Zealand Book Awards for Children and Young Adults, Picture Book award for I am Jellyfish
 2018 — Storylines Notable Books Listing for I Am Jellyfish
 2018 — Storylines Notable Books Listing for Mini Whinny Happy Birthday to Me author Stacy Gregg
 2019 — NZ Book Awards for Children and Young Adults, finalist for Mini Whinny Happy Birthday to Me author Stacy Gregg
 2019 — NZ Arts Foundation, Mallinson Rendel Laureate Award
 2020 — NZ Book Awards for Children and Young Adults, finalist for Mini Whinny Goody Four Shoes author Stacy Gregg

References

External links
 Official website
 Interview with Ruth Paul, Afternoons with Jesse Mulligan, Radio New Zealand, 14 February 2018

Living people
New Zealand children's writers
New Zealand children's book illustrators
New Zealand women children's writers
New Zealand illustrators
People from Wellington City
1964 births
Victoria University of Wellington alumni
Massey University alumni
New Zealand women illustrators